was the 58th emperor of Japan, according to the traditional order of succession.

Kōkō reigned from 884 to 887.

Traditional narrative 
He would later be identified sometimes as "the Emperor of Komatsu". This resulted in the later Emperor Go-Komatsu adopting this name (go- meaning "later", so "Later Emperor Komatsu" or "Emperor Komatsu II").

Tokiyasu Shinnō was the third son of Emperor Ninmyō.  His mother was Fujiwara no Sawako.

Kōkō had four Imperial consorts and 41 Imperial sons and daughters.

Events of Kōkō's life 
The first kampaku Fujiwara no Mototsune was influential in the process by which Kōkō became an emperor.  At the time Emperor Yōzei was deposed, Prince Tokiyasu was already Governor of Hitachi and Chief Minister of Ceremonies (Jibu-kyō, 治部卿)

According to Kitabatake Chikafusa's 14th-century account, Mototsune resolved the problem of succession by simply going to visit Tokiyasu-shinnō, where the kampaku addressed the prince as a sovereign and assigned imperial guards.  The prince signaled his acceptance by going into the imperial palanquin, which then conducted him to the emperor's residence within the palace.  Curiously, he was still wearing the robes of a prince when he decided to take this ride into an entirely unanticipated future.

 February 4, 884 (Gangyō 8, 4th day of the 1st month): In the 8th year of Emperor Yōzei's reign (陽成天皇八年), the emperor was deposed; and scholars then construed that the succession (senso) was received by the third son of former Emperor Ninmyō, who was then age 55.
 March 23, 884 (Gangyō 8, 23rd day of the 2nd month'): Emperor Kōkō is said to have acceded to the throne (sokui).
 885 (Gangyō 9): The era name was changed accordingly in 885.

During his reign, Kōkō revived many ancient court rituals and ceremonies, and one example is the imperial hawking excursion to Serikawa, which had been initiated in 796 by Emperor Kanmu.  This ritual event was revived by Kōkō after a lapse of 50 years.

 January 11, 886 (Ninna 2, 14th day of the 12th month): Kōkō traveled to Seri-gawa to hunt with falcons.  He very much enjoyed this kind of hunting, and he often took time for this kind of activity.
 September 17, 887 (Ninna 3, 26th day of the 8th month ) 仁和三年八月二十六日 -->: Kōkō died at the age of 57.

The actual site of Kōkō's grave is known.  This emperor is traditionally venerated at a memorial Shinto shrine (misasagi) at Kyoto.

The Imperial Household Agency designates this location as Kōkō's mausoleum. It is formally named Kaguragaoka no Higashi no misasagi.

Kugyō
 is a collective term for the very few most powerful men attached to the court of the Emperor of Japan in pre-Meiji eras.

In general, this elite group included only three to four men at a time.  These were hereditary courtiers whose experience and background would have brought them to the pinnacle of a life's career.  During Kōkō's reign, this apex of the Daijō-kan included:
 Kampaku, Fujiwara no Mototsune (藤原基経) (Shōsen-kō, 昭宣公), 836–891.
 Daijō-daijin, Fujiwara no Mototsune.
 Sadaijin, Minamoto no Tōru (源融).
 Udaijin, Minamoto no Masaru (源多).
 Naidaijin (not appointed)
 Dainagon, Fujiwara no Yoshiyo (藤原良世)
 Dainagon, Fujiwara no Fuyuo (藤原冬緒)

 Eras of Kōkō's reign 
The years of Kōkō's reign are more specifically identified by more than one era name or nengō.
 Gangyō (877–885)
 Ninna  (885–889)

 Consorts and children 
Consort (later Kōtaigō): Princess Hanshi (班子女王; 833–900) later Toin-Kisaki (洞院后), Imperial Prince Nakano's daughter (son of Emperor Kanmu)
 First Son: Minamoto no Motonaga (源元長; d. 883), die before Emperor Kōkō's succession
 Twelfth son: Imperial Prince Koretada (是忠親王; 857–922)
 Thirteenth Son: Imperial Prince Koresada (是貞親王; d. 903)
 Fifteenth Son:  Imperial Prince Sadami (定省親王) later Emperor Uda
 Fourth Daughter: Imperial Princess Tadako (忠子内親王; 854–904), married to Emperor Seiwa
 Fifth Daughter: Imperial Princess Kanshi (簡子内親王; d. 914)
 Eighth Daughter: Imperial Princess Yasuko (綏子内親王; d. 925), married to Emperor Yōzei
 Sixteenth Daughter: Imperial Princess Ishi (為子内親王; d. 899), married to Emperor Daigo
Consort (Nyōgo): Fujiwara no Kamiko (藤原佳美子; d. 898), Fujiwara no Mototsune's daughter
Consort (Nyōgo): Fujiwara no Genjiko (藤原元善子), Fujiwara no Yamakage's daughter
Consort (Nyōgo): Taira no Motoko/Tōshi (平等子), Taira no Yoshikaze's daughter
Court Attendant (Koui): Shigeno no Naoko (滋野直子; d. 915)
Fourth Daughter: Imperial Princess Shigeko (繁子内親王; d. 916), 23rd Saiō in Ise Shrine 884–887
Court Attendant (Koui): Sanuki no Naganao's daughter
 Ninth Son: Minamoto no Motomi (源旧鑒; d. 908)
Court Attendant (Koui): Fujiwara Motoko (藤原元子)
Court lady: Sugawara no Ruishi (菅原類子), Sugawara no Koreyoshi's daughter
Court lady: Princess Keishin (桂心女王), Prince Masami's daughter
Seventh Daughter: Imperial Princess Bokushi (穆子内親王; d. 903), 8th Saiin in Kamo Shrine 882–887
Court lady: daughter of Tajihi clan (多治氏の娘)
 Minamoto no Kanshi/Ayako (源緩子/綾子; d. 908)
Court lady: A daughter of Fuse clan (布勢氏の娘)
 Twelfth Son: Shigemizu no Kiyozane (滋水清実), given the family name "Shigemizu" by the Emperor (Shisei Kōka, 賜姓降下) in 886
Court Attendant (Koui): Fujiwara no Kadomune's daughter, later married Minamoto no Noboru
Thirteenth Son (adopted son): Minamoto no Koreshige (源是茂; 886–941), Minamoto no Noboru's son
(from unknown women)
 Second Son: Minamoto no Kaneyoshi (源兼善; d. 879)
 Third son: Minamoto no Nazane (源名実)
 Fourth Son: Minamoto no Atsuyuki (源篤行)
 Fifth Son: Minamoto no Seiyoshi (源最善)
 Sixth Son: Minamoto no Chikayoshi (源近善; d. 918)
 Seventh son: Minamoto no Ototsune (源音恒)
 Eighth Son: Minamoto no Koretsune (源是恒; d. 905)
 Tenth Son: Minamoto no Sadatsune (源貞恒; 857–908)
 Eleventh Son: Minamoto no Narikage (源成蔭)
 Fourteenth Son: Minamoto no Kuninori (源国紀; d. 909)
 Sixteenth Son: Minamoto no Kosen (源香泉)
 Seventeenth Son: Minamoto no Tomosada (源友貞)
 First Daughter: Minamoto no Osoko (源遅子)
 Second Daughter: Minamoto no Reishi (源麗子)
 Third Daughter: Minamoto no Onshi/Kusuko (源音子/奇子; d. 919)
Sixth Daughter: Minamoto no Shushi (源崇子)
 Seventh Daughter: Minamoto no Renshi/Tsurako (源連子; d. 905)
 Ninth Daughter: Minamoto no Reishi (源礼子)
 Tenth Daughter: Minamoto no Saishi (源最子; d. 886)
 Eleventh Daughter: Minamoto no Kaishi (源偕子)
 Twelve Daughter: Minamoto no Mokushi (源黙子; d. 902)
 Thirteenth Daughter: Minamoto no Koreko (源是子)
 Fourteenth Daughter: Minamoto no Heishi (源並子; d. 906)
 Fifteenth Daughter: Minamoto no Shinshi (源深子; d. 917)
 Seventeenth Daughter: Minamoto no Shūshi (源周子; d. 912)
 Eighteenth Daughter: Minamoto no Mitsuko (源密子)
 Minamoto no Washi (源和子; d. 947), married to Emperor Daigo
 Minamoto no Kenshi (源謙子; d. 924)
 Minamoto no Sayako (源袟子)
 Minamoto no Kaishi (源快子; d. 910)
 Minamoto no Zenshi (源善子)

 Poetry 
Emperor Kōkō is well-remembered for his poetry, and one of his waka appeared in the Ogura Hyakunin Isshu:

Ancestry

 See also 
 Emperor Go-Komatsu
 Emperor of Japan
 List of Emperors of Japan
 Imperial cult

 Notes 

 References 
 Brown, Delmer M. and Ichirō Ishida, eds. (1979).  Gukanshō: The Future and the Past. Berkeley: University of California Press. ; 
 Ponsonby-Fane, Richard Arthur Brabazon. (1959).  The Imperial House of Japan. Kyoto: Ponsonby Memorial Society. 
 Titsingh, Isaac. (1834). Nihon Ōdai Ichiran''; ou,  Annales des empereurs du Japon.  Paris: Royal Asiatic Society, Oriental Translation Fund of Great Britain and Ireland. 
 Varley, H. Paul. (1980). Jinnō Shōtōki: A Chronicle of Gods and Sovereigns. New York: Columbia University Press. ; 

 
 

Japanese emperors
830 births
887 deaths
9th-century rulers in Asia
9th-century Japanese monarchs
Hyakunin Isshu poets
People from Kyoto